Cophoscincopus senegalensis is a species of lizard in the family Scincidae. It is found in Senegal and Guinea.

References

Cophoscincopus
Reptiles described in 2012
Taxa named by Jean-François Trape
Taxa named by Oleg Mediannikov
Taxa named by Sébastien Trape